The Hagerstown Aviation Museum is an aviation museum at the Hagerstown Regional Airport in Hagerstown, Maryland. It is focused on the history of the Fairchild Aircraft Corporation.

History 
The idea for an aviation museum in Hagerstown began in 1995 with a group of individuals that included Richard Henson and John Seburn. After a decade of delays, the museum opened to the public in downtown Hagerstown, Maryland on 14 July 2005. The following year, the museum purchased a C-82 at auction from Hawkins and Powers in Greybull, Wyoming.

The museum purchased a C-123 and trucked it to the airport in 2019.

After originally considering building a new hangar, the museum moved to the former Fairchild Aircraft Flight Test Hangar in 2020.

Collection

Aircraft on display 

 Bellanca CE – Original fuselage
 Fairchild 22 C7D 922
 Fairchild 24R-9 R9-405
 Fairchild 24R-46 R46-129
 Fairchild C-82A Packet 45-57814
 Fairchild C-119G Flying Boxcar 22111
 Fairchild C-123K Provider 54-0681
 Fairchild PT-19A 42-65485
 Fairchild PT-19A 42-83447
 Fairchild PT-19A 44-33689
 Fairchild PT-23
 Fairchild PT-26
 Fairchild UC-61C 42-70862
 Kreider-Reisner KR-31
 North American T-6G Texan 49-3390

Aircraft in storage 

 Fairchild F-27F 33
 Fairchild C-123K Provider 54-0592

References

External links 

 

Aerospace museums in Maryland
Hagerstown, Maryland
Museums in Washington County, Maryland